The Episodios Nacionales (National Episodes) are a collection of forty-six historical novels written by Benito Pérez Galdós between 1872 and 1912. They are divided into five series and they deal with Spanish history from roughly 1805 to 1880. They are fictional accounts which add characters invented by the author within historical events.

First series

With the exception of Gerona, all the episodes follow the adventures of the boy Gabriel de Araceli, beginning in French-dominated Spain through the war of Independence, from the battle of Trafalgar to the defeat of the French armies (1805–1814). There are ten books in this series:

Trafalgar
La Corte de Carlos IV [The Court of Charles IV]
El 19 de marzo y el 2 de mayo [The 19th of March and the 2nd of May]
Bailén
Napoleón en Chamartín [Napoleon at Chamartin]
Zaragoza
Gerona
Cádiz 
Juan Martín el Empecinado 
La Batalla de los Arapiles [The Battle of Salamanca]

Second series

Written between 1875 and 1879, it is a series of ten books. Its main character, who is not always the protagonist, is the liberal crusader Salvador Monsalud. At first a guard of King José I, he helps the king escape Spain with the crown jewels, which Jose would sell to pay for his new life in America. Remaining in Spain, Salvador is estranged from power during the six years of absolutist monarchy of Fernando VII (1814–1820), lauded during the Liberal Triennium (1820–1823) and persecuted during the Ominous Decade (1823–1833). His perpetual dissatisfaction guides us through the convulsions of Spain under Fernando, where future conflicts could be seen to have their beginnings. The titles of the Episodes are:
 El equipaje del rey José (The Baggage of King Jose)
 Memorias de un cortesano de 1815 (Memoires of a Courtesan of 1815)
 La segunda casaca (The Second Turncoat)
 El Grande Oriente (The Grande Oriente)
 El 7 de julio (The 7th of July)
 Los Cien Mil Hijos de San Luis (The 100,000 sons of San Luis)
 El terror de 1824 (The Terror of 1824)
 Un voluntario realista (A Royalist Volunteer)
 Los Apostólicos (The Apostolics)
 Un faccioso más y algunos frailes menos (One More Rebel and a Few Less Friars)

After this series, Galdós did not plan to continue, but after the Spanish–American War (the "Disaster of '98"), he decided to follow with another series.

Third series

The divided Spain of the First Carlist War and the Regency of Maria Cristina is the setting of the following episodes, which revolve around the romantic Fernando Calpena. The ten episodes that comprise the series are:

 Zumalacárregui
 Mendizábal
 De Oñate a la Granja (From Oñate to Granja)
 Luchana
 La campaña del Maestrazgo (The Campaign of Maestrazco)
 La estafeta romántica (The Romantic Courier)
 Vergara
 Montes de Oca
 Los Ayacuchos (The Ayacuchans)
 Bodas Reales (Royal Weddings)

Fourth series

José García Fajardo, uninterested in politics, unlike the protagonists of the previous series, is the main character of this series of ten episodes which encompass the entire reign of Isabel II, a contemporary of the author. The titles of this series are:

 Las tormentas del 48 (The Storms of 48)
 Narváez
 Los duendes de la camarilla (The Demons of the Entourage)
 La Revolución de Julio (The July Revolution)
 O'Donnell
 Aita Tettauen
 Carlos VI en la Rápita (Carlos VI in Rápita)
 La vuelta al mundo en la Numancia (The Trip Around the World on the Numancia)
 Prim
 La de los tristes destinos (She of the Sad Destinies)

Fifth series

Tito, a first-person narrator who is not a real person, but a conceit of the author to create thoughtful dialogue, featured in this unfinished series, which begins during the Glorious Revolution in Spain, and contains only six published titles and a draft:

 España sin rey (Spain Without a King)
 España trágica (Tragic Spain)
 Amadeo I
 La Primera República (The First Republic)
 De Cartago a Sagunto (From Carthage to Sagunto)
 Cánovas
 Sagasta (draft)

References

Novels by Benito Pérez Galdós
Novel series